Eric Low Siak Meng (1948 – 3 January 2023) was a Singaporean politician who was a member of the People's Action Party (PAP). He was also a general manager. He contested the Hougang Single Member Constituency (Hougang SMC) in both the 2001 Singapore general election and the 2006 general election, losing both times to Low Thia Khiang from Workers' Party.

Political career
Senior Minister Goh Chok Tong was tasked with the "special assignment" of helping Low win Hougang in the 2006 general elections, along with Sitoh Yih Pin, the PAP candidate for opposition-held Potong Pasir Single Member Constituency. Low and Sitoh were promised more latitude in the Parliament and freedom from being subjected to the party whip if he won Hougang SMC. Despite this boost from the ruling party, Low still failed to secure a win in the general election.

In 2011, Low announced that he would not contest Hougang SMC in the coming general election.

Awards 
Low was awarded the Pingat Bakti Masyarakat (Public Service Medal), Bintang Bakti Masyarakat (Public Service Star) and Bintang Bakti Masyarakat (Public Service Star) - Bar over the years.

Death
Low died from natural causes on 3 January 2023 at the age of 74, he would have been 75 at that year.

References

1948 births
2023 deaths
People's Action Party politicians
Singaporean people of Teochew descent
Recipients of the Pingat Bakti Masyarakat
Recipients of the Bintang Bakti Masyarakat